Judith Grossman is an American writer. She earned a scholarship to Somerville College, Oxford, from which she received a First Class degree in English in 1958. She received a Ph.D. from Brandeis University, in 1968. She has taught at Bennington College. She also taught in the Creative Writing MFA programs at University of California, Irvine from 1992 to 1995 and the University of Iowa (1997). She was chairman of the liberal arts division at Mount Ida College in Newton, Massachusetts.

She was raised Anglican.

She was married to the poet Allen Grossman until his death in 2014. Her children are Lev Grossman, Austin Grossman, and Bathsheba Grossman.

Works

Poetry

Criticism

Reviews
Publishers Weekly (October 1999) said in Her Own Terms Grossman achieved a balance of deadpan wit and understated emotion. Grossman depicts a generation of transatlantic post-war English drifters in the early '60s.

References

20th-century American novelists
American women short story writers
American women novelists
Iowa Writers' Workshop faculty
Living people
Place of birth missing (living people)
Year of birth missing (living people)
20th-century American women writers
20th-century American short story writers
Novelists from Iowa
Alumni of Somerville College, Oxford
American Anglicans
21st-century American women
Mount Ida College faculty